12/6 may refer to:
December 6 (month-day date notation)
June 12 (day-month date notation)
12 shillings and 6 pence in UK predecimal currency

See also
126 (disambiguation)